Chapel of the Chimes Memorial Park and Funeral Home is a  cemetery, mausoleum, crematorium, columbarium and funeral home complex in Hayward, California. The site was first established as a seven-acre cemetery in 1872. One of the memorial park's three mausoleums is circular in design, the only such one in California. The park hosts one of the larger Memorial Day services in the San Francisco Bay Area. A replica of the Angel of Grief statue is located there. The former Masonic Cemetery and Decoto Cemetery are now encompassed within its bounds. The park's owners, NorthStar Memorial Group, also operate the Chapel of the Chimes columbarium in Oakland, California, Skylawn Memorial Park in San Mateo, and Sunset Lawn Chapel of the Chimes in Sacramento.

Notable interments
 Spade Cooley, convicted murderer, western swing musician, big band leader, actor, and television personality
 Thomas Fitch, United States Representative from Nevada
 James Logan, local education official, namesake of James Logan High School
 Daniel Sakai, slain Oakland Police officer
 James Cleveland Whipple, local education official, colleague of James Logan, namesake of Whipple Road in nearby Union City

References

External links
 
 

Chapels in the United States
Cemeteries in Hayward, California
Companies based in Hayward, California
1872 establishments in California